Millionaire is a game show presented by Marty Whelan. The studio-based show aired on Friday nights as a summer "filler" between 19 May and 1 September 1995.

Format
Millionaire was produced in association with the National Lottery. Entry to the show was by collecting a particular sequence on special Millionaire scratch cards and each week four contestants competed for the chance to win up to £100,000. The final show saw each of the fifteen contestants, who won through the weekly rounds, compete for £1 million.

All programmes of it will be on RTE Player Christmas 2021 to celebrate 60 years of television.

References

1995 Irish television series debuts
1995 Irish television series endings
Irish game shows about lotteries
RTÉ original programming
Television game shows with incorrect disambiguation